Werner Heilig (20 October 1921 – 29 January 1987) was a German footballer.

He played for Eintracht Frankfurt from 1939 to 1957.

Honours 
 Oberliga Süd: 1952–53; runners-up 1953–54

References
 
 Werner Heilig at eintracht-archiv.de

1921 births
1987 deaths
German footballers
Eintracht Frankfurt players
Association football midfielders